These are the Record World number-one albums of 1967.

Chart history

References

American music-related lists
1967 in American music